The church of Santa Maria della Pietà or della Visitazione is a prominent church in the sestiere of Castello in Venice, Italy. It is sited on the Riva degli Schiavoni, a short walk from the Doge's Palace.

History
The present church was built from 1745-1760 adjacent to the site of an earlier church, and adjacent to the orphanage and hospital, the Ospedale della Pietà. The design was by Giorgio Massari, but its façade remained incomplete, with marble facing rising only a third of the way up the columns. In 1906, it was completed but without the originally projected three statues on the roof. Only a single simple cross ornaments the centre. Above the entrance is a large bas-relief representing Charity (1800) by Marsili.

The interior is oval. The ceilings were frescoed by Tiepolo depicting Strength and Peace and Triumph of Faith, flanked by angelic musicians, while the presbytery was painted by the same artist with the theological Virtues, (1745-1755). Tiepolo was aided by Jacopo Guarana, the pupil of Sebastiano Ricci who had originally made designs for the frescoes.

A chapel by Giovanni Maria Morlaiter with a precious tabernacle decorated with gilded bronze figures and, at the sides, the Archangels Gabriel and Michael. The altar-piece, representing the Visitation, was begun by Giambattista Piazzetta and, on his death, finished by his disciple, Giuseppe Angeli. In the choir above the main entrance door there is a painting depicting Jesus in Simon’s house (1544) by Alessandro Bonvicino, called the Moretto da Brescia. In the side altars there are paintings by Maggiotto, Giuseppe Angeli, and Angelo Marinetti.

References

Roman Catholic churches in Venice
18th-century Roman Catholic church buildings in Italy